Massuria is a genus of spiders in the family Thomisidae. It was first described in 1887 by Tamerlan Thorell. , it contains 8 Asian species.

Species
Massuria comprises the following species:
Massuria angulata Thorell, 1887 – Myanmar
Massuria bandian Tang & Li, 2010 – China
Massuria bellula Xu, Han & Li, 2008 – China (Hong Kong)
Massuria ovalis Tang & Li, 2010 – China
Massuria roonwali (Basu, 1964) – India
Massuria sreepanchamii (Tikader, 1962) – India
Massuria uthoracica Sen, Saha & Raychaudhuri, 2012 – India
Massuria watari Ono, 2002 – Japan

References

Thomisidae
Thomisidae genera
Spiders of Asia
Taxa named by Tamerlan Thorell